Clarence Edward "Dolly" Dolson (May 23, 1897 — August 19, 1978) was a Canadian ice hockey player who played 93 games in the National Hockey League between 1928 and 1931 with the Detroit Cougars/Falcons. He has 35 wins, 41 loses, and 17 ties with a 1.98 GAA. He was born in Hespeler, Ontario.

Career statistics

Regular season and playoffs

External links

1897 births
1978 deaths
Canadian ice hockey goaltenders
Cleveland Indians (IHL) players
Detroit Cougars players
Detroit Falcons players
Ice hockey people from Ontario
London Panthers players
Ontario Hockey Association Senior A League (1890–1979) players
Sportspeople from Cambridge, Ontario
Stratford Nationals players
Canadian expatriate ice hockey players in the United States